Billy Eugene Owens (born May 1, 1969) is an American former professional basketball player who played for several teams in the National Basketball Association (NBA). He played college basketball for Syracuse, where he was an All-American and the 1991 Big East Conference Player of the Year. Born in Carlisle, Pennsylvania, Owens played for Carlisle High School.

Amateur career
As a high school senior, Owens averaged 34 points per game, and helped lead Carlisle High School (Pennsylvania) to four consecutive state titles. He was considered to be the second best prep player of 1988, behind Alonzo Mourning. Owens and Mourning were co-MVP's in the McDonald's' Game. Throughout his career, Owens drew some comparisons to Magic Johnson due to his great versatility, ball handling and passing skills for his height.

In his three seasons with Syracuse he averaged 17.9 points, 8.8 rebounds, 3.7 assists and 2.1 steals per game out of 103 games. In his junior season he was named Big East Player of the Year.

Professional career
As a 6'8" small forward/shooting guard from Syracuse University, he was selected by the Sacramento Kings in the 1991 NBA draft. However, after Owens remained a holdout beyond the start of the regular season, he was traded to the Golden State Warriors in exchange for high-scoring guard Mitch Richmond.
The trade broke up the popular "Run TMC" trio of Mitch Richmond, Tim Hardaway, and Chris Mullin; Owens' additional height compared to Richmond was the size that coach and general manager Don Nelson believed would complete the team. Nelson said he "was under pressure to get [the team] bigger" to improve the Warriors from a good team to a great one.

Owens averaged over 15 points and nearly eight rebounds during his tenure with the Warriors, including an NBA All-Rookie First Team selection in 1992. The Warriors improved from 44 to 55 games won in his first season.  However, he never provided his expected impact and played only three seasons with Golden State. Owens spent ten seasons with the Warriors, Miami Heat, Sacramento Kings, Seattle SuperSonics, Philadelphia 76ers, and Detroit Pistons before a string of injuries finally took its toll; his career ended in 2001.

Coaching 
From 2010 to 2018, Owens served as an assistant coach for the men's basketball team at Division III Rutgers-Camden.  In practice, players asked Owens how they should prepare themselves for professional careers.  “I don’t sugar-coat it because then you’re playing with young kids’ minds,” Owens said. “For them to have their dreams crushed can do serious damage to them when they become real adults.”

National team
He played for the US national team in the 1990 FIBA World Championship, winning the bronze medal. In the same year, he also represented the United States at the Goodwill Games in Seattle and led the team in scoring en route to a silver medal.

NBA player statistics

Regular season 

|-
| style="text-align:left;"| 
| style="text-align:left;"|Golden State
| 80 || 77 || 31.4 || .525 || .111 || .654 || 8.0 || 2.4 || 1.1 || 0.8 || 14.3
|-
| style="text-align:left;"| 
| style="text-align:left;"|Golden State
| 37 || 37 || 32.5 || .501 || .091 || .639 || 7.1 || 3.9 || 0.9 || 0.8 || 16.5
|-
| style="text-align:left;"| 
| style="text-align:left;"|Golden State
| 79 || 72 || 34.7 || .507 || .200 || .610 || 8.1 || 4.1 || 1.1 || 0.8 || 15.0
|-
| style="text-align:left;"| 
| style="text-align:left;"|Miami
| 70 || 60 || 32.8 || .491 || .091 || .620 || 7.2 || 3.5 || 1.1 || 0.4 || 14.3
|-
| style="text-align:left;"| 
| style="text-align:left;"|Miami
| 40 || 40 || 34.7 || .505 || .000 || .633 || 7.2 || 3.4 || 0.8 || 0.6 || 14.8
|-
| style="text-align:left;"| 
| style="text-align:left;"|Sacramento
| 22 || 11 || 27.0 || .420 || .417 || .643 || 5.7 || 3.2 || 0.9 || 0.7 || 9.9
|-
| style="text-align:left;"|
| style="text-align:left;"|Sacramento
| 66 || 56 || 30.2 || .467 || .347 || .697 || 5.9 || 2.8 || 0.9 || 0.4 || 11.0
|-
| style="text-align:left;"|
| style="text-align:left;"|Sacramento
| 78 || 78 || 30.1 || .464 || .371 || .589 || 7.5 || 2.8 || 1.2 || 0.5 || 10.5
|-
| style="text-align:left;"|
| style="text-align:left;"|Seattle
| 21 || 19 || 21.5 || .394 || .455 || .800 || 3.8 || 1.8 || 0.6 || 0.2 || 7.8
|-
| style="text-align:left;"|
| style="text-align:left;"|Philadelphia
| 46 || 7 || 20.0 || .434 || .333 || .594 || 4.2 || 1.3 || 0.6 || 0.3 || 5.9
|-
| style="text-align:left;"|
| style="text-align:left;"|Golden State
| 16 || 4 || 24.1 || .380 || .286 || .595 || 6.8 || 2.4 || 0.4 || 0.3 || 6.4
|-
| style="text-align:left;"|
| style="text-align:left;"|Detroit
| 45 || 14 || 17.6 || .383 || .150 || .475 || 4.6 || 1.2 || 0.7 || 0.3 || 4.4
|- class="sortbottom"
| style="text-align:center;" colspan="2"| Career
| 600 || 475 || 29.4 || .481 || .291 || .629 || 6.7 || 2.8 || 0.9 || 0.5 || 11.7

Playoffs 

|-
|style="text-align:left;"|1992
|style="text-align:left;”|Golden State
|4||4||39.3||.526||–||.630||8.3||3.3||2.0||0.5||19.3
|-
|style="text-align:left;"|1994
|style="text-align:left;”|Golden State
|3||3||42.3||.500||.000||.750||10.0||4.3||1.3||0.7||19.7
|-
|style="text-align:left;"|1996
|style="text-align:left;”|Sacramento
|4||4||32.8||.441||.000||.500||6.5||3.5||1.0||0.3||8.3
|- class="sortbottom"
| style="text-align:center;" colspan="2"| Career
| 11 || 11 || 37.7 || .496 || .000 || .644 || 8.1 || 3.6 || 1.5 || 0.5 || 15.4

References

External links
 
 NBA Draft Busts #13 

1969 births
Living people
1990 FIBA World Championship players
African-American basketball players
All-American college men's basketball players
American men's basketball players
Basketball players from Pennsylvania
Competitors at the 1990 Goodwill Games
Detroit Pistons players
Golden State Warriors players
Goodwill Games medalists in basketball
McDonald's High School All-Americans
Miami Heat players
Parade High School All-Americans (boys' basketball)
People from Carlisle, Pennsylvania
Philadelphia 76ers players
Sacramento Kings draft picks
Sacramento Kings players
Seattle SuperSonics players
Shooting guards
Small forwards
Syracuse Orange men's basketball players
United States men's national basketball team players
21st-century African-American people
20th-century African-American sportspeople